Viðar Guðjohnsen (born 14 January 1958) is an Icelandic judoka. He competed in the men's middleweight event at the 1976 Summer Olympics.

References

1958 births
Living people
Vidar Gudjohnsen
Vidar Gudjohnsen
Judoka at the 1976 Summer Olympics
Place of birth missing (living people)